Tout le monde en parle may refer to:

Tout le monde en parle (Canadian talk show)
Tout le monde en parle (French talk show)
"Tout le monde en parle", a 2004 song by Karlito & Rak from Street Lourd Hall Stars